Zoran Kostić may refer to:
Zoran Kostić (musician) (born 1964), Serbian punk rock musician
Zoran Kostić (footballer) (born 1982), Serbian football player